FK Anzhi may refer to:

FC Anzhi Makhachkala
FC Anzhi-2 Makhachkala
FC Anzhi Tallinn (it)